The Third Avenue Bridge carries southbound road traffic on Third Avenue over the Harlem River, connecting the boroughs of Manhattan and the Bronx in New York City. It once carried southbound New York State Route 1A.  The Third Avenue Bridge carries traffic south from the intersections of either Third Avenue and East 135th Street, or Bruckner Boulevard and Lincoln Avenue, in the Bronx. On the Manhattan side, the bridge funnels traffic into three locations: East 128th Street; the intersection of East 129th Street and Lexington Avenue; or the southbound Harlem River Drive in Manhattan.

The bridge was formerly bidirectional, but converted to one-way operation southbound on August 5, 1941 on the same day the Willis Avenue Bridge was similarly converted to one-way northbound.  In 1955, the original multi-truss bridge constructed in 1898 was removed and sold. A rebuilt bridge reopened in December 1956.

Reconstruction

As part of a major NYCDOT reconstruction project from 2001-2005, a new swing span was floated into place on October 29, 2004. Two lanes of Manhattan-bound traffic opened on December 6, 2004, and the remaining three lanes opened in 2005. In addition to replacing the swing span and its machinery, the project included redesigned approach ramps to the bridge on the Bronx side and off the bridge in Manhattan. As reconstructed, the Third Avenue Bridge carries five lanes of Manhattan-bound traffic from the Bronx, which split to three ramps in Manhattan: to East 128th Street and Second Avenue; to Lexington Avenue and East 129th Street; and to the southbound Harlem River Drive/FDR Drive.

For 2011, the New York City Department of Transportation, which operates and maintains the bridge, reported an average daily traffic volume  of 59,603; the bridge reached a peak ADT of 73,121 in 2000. Between 2000 and 2014, the bridge opened for vessels 93 times, including 60 times in 2007.

Public transportation
The Third Avenue Bridge carries the  bus route operated by MTA New York City Transit. The route's average weekday ridership is 19,951.

TV documentary
Discovery Channel contracted Barner-Alper Productions of Toronto to produce an episode of Mega-Builders, titled "Spanning the Harlem", about the work leading up to the float-in of the swing span. It first aired in 2005 in Canada on Discovery Canada.

References

External links
 
 NYCRoads.com: Third Avenue Bridge Historic Overview
 New York City Department of Transportation - Harlem River Bridges
 NYC DoT Third Avenue Bridge

Bridges completed in 1898
Bridges in Manhattan
Bridges in the Bronx
Bridges over the Harlem River
Harlem
Road bridges in New York (state)
Swing bridges in the United States
Pedestrian bridges in New York City
Third Avenue